Pool D of the 2015 Fed Cup Europe/Africa Group III was one of four pools in the Europe/Africa Group III of the 2015 Fed Cup. Three teams competed in a round robin competition, with the top team and bottom teams proceeding to their respective sections of the play-offs: the top team played for advancement to Group II.

Standings

Round-robin

Moldova vs. Mozambique

Namibia vs. Macedonia

Moldova vs. Macedonia

Namibia vs. Mozambique

Moldova vs. Namibia

Macedonia vs. Mozambique

See also
Fed Cup structure

References

External links
 Fed Cup website

A3